Comispira compta is a species of sea snail, a deep-water marine gastropod mollusk in the family Cochlespiridae.

Description
The length of the shell found is 24.4 mm.

Distribution
This species has been found in the Bismarck Sea off Papua New Guinea.

References

 Li B.-Q. [Bao-Quan] & Li X.-Z. [Xin-Zheng]. (2008). Report on the two subfamilies Clavatulinae and Cochlespirinae (Mollusca: Neogastropoda: Turridae) from the China seas. Zootaxa. 1771: 31-42

External links
 Kantor Yu.I., Fedosov A.E. & Puillandre N. (2018). New and unusual deep-water Conoidea revised with shell, radula and DNA characters. Ruthenica. 28(2): 47-82

compta
Gastropods described in 2018